Canterbury power station supplied electricity to the city of Canterbury, Kent, England from 1900 to 1960. This small generating station was owned and operated by Canterbury Corporation until the nationalisation of the British electricity supply industry in 1948.  The power station was redeveloped several times: including the incorporation of new plant in the 1920s. Canterbury power station was decommissioned in about 1960.

History
In 1883 a provisional order was granted by the Board of Trade under the Electric Lighting Acts for the generation and supply of electricity to the City of Canterbury. This was confirmed by Parliament in the Electric Lighting Orders Confirmation (No. 1) Act 1883 (46 & 47 Vict. c. ccxiii). However, no scheme was taken forward. Another provisional order was obtained by the corporation under the Electric Lighting Orders Confirmation (No. 1) Act 1891 (54 & 55 Vict. c. xlix). The power station was built off Northgate Street (51°17'03"N 1°05'10"E) and first supplied electricity in 1900.

Equipment specification
The initial plant included a pair of generators.

By 1923 the generating plant comprised:

 Coal-fired boilers generating up to 33,000 lb/h (4.16 kg/s) of steam, the steam was supplied to:
 Generators:
 1 × 150 kW reciprocating engine driving a generator
 2 × 300 kW reciprocating engines driving generators
 1 × 1,250 kW steam turbo-alternators, generating 3-phase 50 Hz current at 6.6 kV.

Electricity supplies available to consumers were 220 and 440 V DC

New plant 1923–29
New plant was commissioned over the period 1923–29 comprising:

 Boilers:
 2 × Babcock & Wilcox boilers with chain grate stokers, each producing 15,000 lb/h (1.89 kg/s) of steam, steam conditions 200 psi and 670 °F (13.8 bar, 354 °C)
 Generating equipment:
 1 × Brush-Ljungstrom 1,875 kW turbo-alternator
 2 × Brush-Ljungstrom 1,250 kW turbo-alternators, 3-phase 50 Hz 6.6 kV
 2 × Bruce-Peebles converters 500 kW and 250 kW

Condenser cooling water was drawn from the nearby River Stour.

Operations

Operating data 1921–23
The operating data for the period 1921–23 is shown in the table:

Under the terms of the Electricity (Supply) Act 1926 (16 & 17 Geo. 5 c. 51) the Central Electricity Board (CEB) was established in 1926. The CEB identified high efficiency ‘selected’ power stations that would supply electricity most effectively. The CEB also constructed the national grid (1927–33) to connect power stations within a region.

Operating data 1946
Canterbury power station operating data, 1946 was:

The British electricity supply industry was nationalised in 1948 under the provisions of the Electricity Act 1947 (10 & 11 Geo. 6 c. 54). The Canterbury electricity undertaking was abolished, ownership of Canterbury power station was vested in the British Electricity Authority, and subsequently the Central Electricity Authority and the Central Electricity Generating Board (CEGB). At the same time the electricity distribution and sales responsibilities of the Canterbury electricity undertaking were transferred to the South Eastern Electricity Board (SEEBOARD).

Operating data 1954–58
Operating data for the period 1954–58 is shown in the table:

Closure
Canterbury power station was decommissioned in about 1960. The buildings were subsequently demolished and the area has been redeveloped with commercial units.

See also
 Timeline of the UK electricity supply industry
 List of power stations in England

References

Coal-fired power stations in England
Demolished power stations in the United Kingdom
Former power stations in England
Buildings and structures in Canterbury